{{safesubst:#invoke:RfD||2=Secondary Period|month = March
|day =  7
|year = 2023
|time = 03:05
|timestamp = 20230307030537

|content=
REDIRECT Mesozoic

}}